The 2011 Save Cup was a professional tennis tournament played on clay courts. It was the ninth edition of the tournament which is part of the 2011 ITF Women's Circuit. It took place in Mestre, Italy between 12 and 18 September 2011.

WTA entrants

Seeds

 1 Rankings are as of August 29, 2011.

Other entrants
The following players received wildcards into the singles main draw:
  Evelyn Mayr
  Tereza Mrdeža
  Federica Quercia
  Camilla Rosatello

The following players received entry from the qualifying draw:
  Federica di Sarra
  Simona Dobrá
  Diāna Marcinkēviča
  Agnese Zucchini

Champions

Singles

 Mona Barthel def.  Garbiñe Muguruza Blanco, 7–5, 6–2

Doubles

 Valentyna Ivakhnenko /  Marina Melnikova def.  Tímea Babos /  Magda Linette, 6–4, 7–5

External links
ITF Search 
Official site

Save Cup
Save Cup
2011 in Italian tennis